Dimitris Fotakis is associate professor of Theoretical Computer Science at the National Technical University of Athens. He is a prominent researcher in the field of algorithmic game theory.

Born and raised in Patras, he received a Computer Engineering Diploma (1994) and a PhD in Computer Science (1999) from the Department of Computer Engineering and Informatics, University of Patras, Greece. From September 2001 until September 2003, he was a Postdoctoral Researcher at the Max-Planck-Institut für Informatik, Algorithms and Complexity Group, Saarbrücken, Germany. Since February 2009, he has been a faculty member with the Division of Computer Science, School of Electrical and Computer Engineering, National Technical University of Athens, Greece.

References

Scientists from Patras
Greek computer scientists
Living people
University of Patras alumni
Year of birth missing (living people)